Andy Reilly (born 25 May 1986) is a Scottish former professional footballer who played as a midfielder.

Career
Born in Dundee, Reilly played for Dundee, Arbroath , Carnoustie Panmure and Linlithgow Rose.

References

1986 births
Living people
Scottish footballers
Dundee F.C. players
Arbroath F.C. players
Carnoustie Panmure F.C. players
Linlithgow Rose F.C. players
Scottish Premier League players
Scottish Football League players
Association football midfielders